Mauricio Rodríguez may refer to:

Mauricio Alonso Rodríguez, Salvadoran football player and manager
Mauricio Rodriguez Anza, Mexican architect and designer
Mauricio Rodriguez, vocalist and frontman of Mauricio & Palodeagua
Mauricio Rodríguez (composer), Mexican musician.
Mauricio Rodríguez (athlete), Venezuelan discus thrower
Mauricio Rodríguez Múnera, Colombian journalist and ambassador.
Mauricio Rodríguez (politician), Venezuelan Minister of Communications and Information